The Maruti XA Alpha is a concept car produced by Maruti in India. It was unveiled on 28 May 2013.

After several design changes, it came to market in 2016 as the Vitara Brezza.

Specifications

The XA Alpha was intended to cost under 1 million Rupees in its final version. The XA Alpha has a seating capacity of 5 people

The petrol version utilises the Suzuki K-series petrol engine expected to fit up to 1.4 litres, whereas the diesel version uses an engine supplied by Fiat.

See also
Maruti
Maruti Swift
Maruti Suzuki Kizashi
Maruti Exports
Automotive industry in India
Suzuki & Maruti Suzuki
Maruti 800

References

XA Alpha